The New York Television Festival (NYTVF) is a yearly festival dedicated to the celebration and promotion of independent small-screen productions, web series, and television.

Background 
The festival was founded in 2005, and is held in venues across New York City. Its main event is the Independent Pilot Competition, which showcases independent television pilots to industry executives and producers. HBO, NBC Universal, A&E, and many other networks, have all made regular appearances at the festival, while pilots in the competition have received development deals. In addition to the pilot competition, the festival hosts parties, seminars, and other events to honor television as an institution and as an art form.

Reception 
New York Magazine dubbed the festival "small screen Sundance". In 2017, Tubefilter described the festival's competition slate as "diverse", noting that "44% of all selected projects feature people of color as either creator, writer, or director" and that "71% of the projects feature at least one woman in a core creative role".

See also

 List of television festivals

References

External links
Official website

Festivals in New York City
Festivals established in 2005
Television festivals